The Best Player in PlusLiga (MVP) is an annual award given to the best player in PlusLiga.

Recipients

 2004–2005  Piotr Gruszka
 2005–2006  Mariusz Wlazły
 2006–2007  Paweł Zagumny
 2007–2008  Mariusz Wlazły
 2008–2009  Stéphane Antiga
 2009–2010  Mariusz Wlazły
 2010–2011  Mariusz Wlazły
 2011–2012  György Grozer
 2012–2013  Luiz Felipe Fonteles
 2013–2014  Mariusz Wlazły
 2014–2015  Jochen Schöps
 2015–2016  Benjamin Toniutti

External links
 PLUSLiga official site
 PZPS (Polish Volleyball Union) official site

PlusLiga
Most valuable player awards
Volleyball awards